The Charleston Carifest is a four-day festival held every year in June in South Carolina, organized by Lorna Shelton-Beck. Inaugurated in 2006, it is a celebration that takes place during the Caribbean American Heritage Month, marking a co-joining of European and African customs which has been developing over the last 350 years.

Some events that have been held over the years include: the Jouvert, All White Fete, Street Parade, Reggae, culture, food, and the international Soca. The parade goes through the streets of Charleston to Brittlebank Park. Different Caribbean regions are the focal point each year. For example, in 2018 the focus was Cuba and in 2019 it was Barbados and the Virgin Islands. In 2020 the event went online due to the worldwide coronavirus pandemic, with the featured country being Jamaica. That year – following the recent increase in racial tensions – the festival was also used as part of the diversity education and inclusion training for faculty and staff at the College of Charleston.

References

Festivals in South Carolina